Typhlosyrinx praecipua is a species of sea snail, a marine gastropod mollusk in the family Raphitomidae.

Description
The length of the shell attains 38 mm, its diameter 15 mm.

Distribution
This marine species occurs off Travancore, India; Gulf of Aden.

References

 Smith, E. A., 1899, On Mollusca from the Bay of Bengal and the Arabian Sea, Annals and Magazine of Natural History, 7,4,237-251. 
 Powell, A. W. B., 1969, The family Turridae in the Indo-Pacific. Part 2. The subfamily Turriculinae, Indo-Pacific Mo lIusca, 2(10),207-415
 Sysoev, A., 1996. Deep-sea conoidean gastropods collected by the John Murray Expedition, 1933–34

External links
 Bouchet, P. & Sysoev, A., 2001. Typhlosyrinx-like tropical deep-water turriform gastropods (Mollusca, Gastropoda, Conoidea). Journal of Natural History 35: 1693-1715
 Biolib.cz: image

praecipua
Gastropods described in 1899